"Is This Love?" is a song by Brooklyn-based indie rock band Clap Your Hands Say Yeah, from their eponymous debut album.

On December 5, 2005, the song was released as a single in the United Kingdom by Wichita Recordings as the band's debut release outside of the United States. The single was backed with another track from the album, "Heavy Metal", and reached #74 on the UK Singles Chart.

Track listing
 "Is This Love?" – 3:11
 "Heavy Metal" – 4:01

2005 singles
Clap Your Hands Say Yeah songs
2005 songs
Wichita Recordings singles